Muhammad Ali (born Raymond Patterson, December 23, 1936) is an American free jazz drummer.

Early life 
Ali was born and raised in Philadelphia where he, along with his father and brothers, converted to Islam. His older brother, Rashied Ali, was also a drummer.

Career 
He recorded with Albert Ayler in 1969 on the sessions released as Music Is the Healing Force of the Universe and The Last Album. Like many Jazz musicians of the 60's, he moved to Europe in 1969 along with Frank Wright, Noah Howard, and Bobby Few.

The Jazz Discography states that Ali participated in 26 recording sessions from 1967 to 1983.

In October 2006, Ali participated in a concert to celebrate John Coltrane's 80th birthday in his hometown of Philadelphia. Also featured were his brother, pianist Dave Burrell, and bassist Reggie Workman. He also played with alto saxophonist Noah Howard in the summer of 2008. In 2010, he recorded Planetary Unknown in a quartet led by David S. Ware, Ali's first recording in nearly thirty years.

Discography

As sideman
With Idris Ackamoor, Rashied Al Akbar, and Earl Cross
Ascent of the Nether Creatures (NoBusiness, 2014) recorded in 1980

With Albert Ayler
Music Is the Healing Force of the Universe (Impulse!, 1969)
The Last Album (Impulse!, 1971)
Holy Ghost: Rare & Unissued Recordings (1962–70) (Revenant, 2004)

With Hans Dulfer
El saxofón (Catfish, 1971)

With Bobby Few
More or Less Few (Center of the World, 1973)
Rhapsody in Few (Black Lion, 1983)

With Noah Howard
The Black Ark (Freedom, 1971)
Space Dimension (America, 1971)
Live in Europe Vol. 1 (Sun, 1975)

With Steve Lacy
Associates (Musica Jazz, 1996)

With Michel Pilz
Jamabiko (M.P., 1984)

With Saheb Sarbib
Live In Europe Vol 1 (Sasa, 1976)
Live In Europe Vol 2 (Marge, 1976)

With Archie Shepp
Pitchin Can (America, 1970)
Coral Rock (America, 1973)
Live At The Festival (Enja, 1975) (one track)
Doodlin' (Inner City, 1976)

With Alan Shorter
 Orgasm (Verve, 1969)

With Alan Silva
The Shout - Portrait for a Small Woman (Sun Records, 1979)

With David S. Ware
Planetary Unknown (AUM Fidelity, 2011)
 Live at Jazzfestival Saalfelden 2011 (AUM Fidelity, 2012)

With Frank Wright
Your Prayer (ESP-Disk, 1967)
One for John (BYG, 1970) 
Church Number Nine (Odeon, 1971)
Center of the World (Center of the World, 1972)
Last Polka in Nancy? (Center of the World, 1973)
Adieu, Little Man (Center of the World, 1974)
For Example - Workshop Freie Musik 1969 - 1978 (FMP, 1978) (one track)
The Complete ESP-Disk Recordings (ESP-Disk, 2005)
Unity (ESP-Disk, 2006)

With Bobby Zankel
 Celebrating William Parker @ 65 (Not Two, 2017)

References

1936 births
Living people
African-American drummers
African-American Muslims
Converts to Islam
American jazz drummers
Free jazz drummers
20th-century American drummers
American male drummers
20th-century American male musicians
American male jazz musicians
20th-century African-American musicians
21st-century African-American people